Faisal Hmoud Al Malek Al-Sabah (born 11 December 1963) is a member of Kuwait's ruling family, a high diplomat, and was appointed the governor of Al Farwaniyah Governorate holding the rank of minister. Al-Sabah earned his bachelor's and master's degrees in Political Science and Economics. Al-Sabah then started his political career as the Director of Protocol at the Al-Diwan Al-Amiri of His Highness the Crown Prince and Prime Minister from 1986 to 2003. From then on Al-Sabah assumed a position as the undersecretary at the Al-Diwan Al-Amiri of the Prime Minister. That year Al-Sabah was appointed as the Kuwaiti ambassador to the Sultanate of Oman, and the non-resident Ambassador to Mauritius. In 2007 Al-Sabah was appointed as the Kuwaiti Ambassador to Jordan, and the non-resident Ambassador to Palestine and Iraq.

Personal life
Al-Sabah is married  with two sons and two daughters.

Positions
 Head of the committee that planned Kuwait's forty anniversary for the countries independence, and tenth year of liberation.
 General Coordinator of the headquarters of the Kuwaiti government during its presence at its headquarters in Taif, Saudi Arabia, in the 1990 Gulf War.
 Assistant Chairman and Director General for the committee of ceremonies of many of the Arab and Islamic summits.
 Board member of Warbah insurance company.
 Director of Protocol at the Diwan of the Crown Prince and Prime Minister. 1986
 Under-secretary of the Diwan of the Prime Minister (Bayan Palace) 2003.
 Ambassador of the State of Kuwait to the Sultanate of Oman and the non-resident Ambassador to the Republic Mauritius 2004 − 2007
 Ambassador of the State of Kuwait to the Hashemite Kingdom of Jordan, and the non-resident Ambassador to Palestine and Iraq

References

 http://abu-malek.com/

1963 births
Living people
Faisal H. M. Al-Sabah
Ambassadors of Kuwait to Jordan
Ambassadors of Kuwait to Iraq
Ambassadors of Kuwait to the State of Palestine
Ambassadors of Kuwait to Oman
Ambassadors of Kuwait to Mauritius
Kuwaiti diplomats